Dejagere, Dejaegere or Dejaeghere is a Belgian surname. Notable people with the surname include:

Brecht Dejaegere (born 1991), Belgian footballer
Georges Dejagere (1879–1955), French gymnast
Veerle Dejaeghere (born 1973), Belgian runner

Dutch-language surnames